In Glorious Times is the third studio album by avant-rock/metal band Sleepytime Gorilla Museum. The album was released on May 29, 2007.

About the album, The End Records has stated:

The albums drums are performed by Matthias Bossi, who replaced previous drummer Frank Grau. As this ended up being the final album released by the band, every Sleepytime Gorilla Museum album has officially featured a different drummer, present in that capacity only for their one record.

Song information

Helpless Corpses Enactment
Prior to the album's release, the track "Helpless Corpses Enactment" was made available for download. On May 22, 2007, one week before the album's release, a video for the same song was also released. It was directed by Adam Feinstein.

The lyrics for "Helpless Corpses Enactment" are taken from the book Finnegans Wake by James Joyce.

Track listing

Personnel
The instruments listed here are as they appear in the booklet of the cd.
 Matthias Bossi: drums, piano, glockenspiel, xylophone
 Michael Iago Mellender: percussion, trumpet, guitar, Lever-action lever, Vatican, Valhalla, xylophone, toy piano, Tangularium, Electric Pancreas
 Carla Kihlstedt: violin, Percussion-guitar, bass harmonica, nyckelharpa
 Nils Frykdahl: guitar, Percussion-guitar
 Dan Rathbun: bass, Sledgehammer-dulcimer, Thing
All sing.

 Guest Voices: Dawn McCarthy (track 2), The Billy Nayer Show, Joel, Allen, Olivia (track 3), Marc "Fushler" Goodman, Ian Pelicci (track 7)

References

External links
 Sleepytime Gorilla Museum official page
 The End Records Label
 
 
  Prog Archives Review & Information

2007 albums
Sleepytime Gorilla Museum albums
The End Records albums